BBN might refer to:
 Bayesian belief network, a probabilistic graphical model that represents a set of random variables and their conditional independencies via a directed acyclic graph
 Bible Broadcasting Network, a global Christian radio network headquartered in Charlotte, North Carolina
 Big Bang nucleosynthesis
 Big Blue Nation, the fan base of the University of Kentucky athletics programs
 Big Brother Naija, a Nigerian reality show 
 Brevard Business News
 Buckingham Browne & Nichols School (BB&N), a private school in Cambridge, Massachusetts
 9-Borabicyclo(3.3.1)nonane (9-BBN), a reagent used in organic chemistry
 The 3-letter code for Blackburn railway station in the UK
 Bengbu South railway station, China Railway pinyin code BBN
 Raytheon BBN Technologies, formerly Bolt, Beranek and Newman, a technology company in Cambridge, Massachusetts
 BBN Music, American music cooperation
 Beyond National Jurisdiction (BBN), United Nations Convention on the Law of the Sea